Xenochromis hecqui is a species of cichlid endemic to Lake Tanganyika in East Africa. This species is a scale eater, consuming the scales off of other fishes, but will also feed on copepods. Currently it is the only known member of its genus. The specific name honours the Belgian Lieutenant Célestin Hecq (1859-1910), a member of the Belgian colonial forces fighting the slave trade who collected the type of this species.

References

 
Taxa named by George Albert Boulenger
Taxonomy articles created by Polbot
Monotypic fish genera